Kanangra is an Australian Aboriginal word for "beautiful view" and may refer to:

 Kanangra (ferry), a retired passenger ferry on Sydney Harbour
 Kanangra-Boyd National Park, located in the Central Tablelands region of New South Wales in Australia
 Kanangra Creek, a creek in the Kanangra-Boyd National Park
 Kanangra Falls, a waterfall on the Kanangra Creek
 Kanangra wattle, a shrub belonging to the genus Acacia and the subgenus Phyllodineae that is endemic to New South Wales